Elisabet Abeyà Lafontana (born 20 May 1951) is a teacher, psychologist and Catalan novelist.

Life 
Abeyà was born in Barcelona. She has translated from English into Catalan three works by the orientalist Joan Mascaró Fornés. Like Joan Mascaró, she is a sympathizer of the international Esperanto language. 
Her works have been translated into Asturian, Breton, Castilian, ususcar, French, Galician, Dutch and Swedish.

Work 
 Children's Literature  
Ansa per ansa: material de lectura i escriptura (1979)
La bruixa que va perdre la granera (1985)
¿Qué seré cuando sea mayor?, La Galera 1989 (Què seré quan sigui gran? 1987)
 (1987)
Querido abuelo, La Galera, 1990 (Estimat avi, 1990)
La bruja que iba en bicicleta, La Galera 1991 (La bruixa que anava amb bicicleta, 1991)
Siete hermanos músicos, La Galera 2002 (Set Germans músics, 1991)
Regal d'aniversari (1992)
M'agrada jugar (1993)
María, la quejica, La Galera 1997 (Rondina que rondinaràs, 1997)
I un punt més: contes per tornas a contar, Moll, 2004
El tren que anava a la mar (2005)

 Child psychology  
Emociones, Rosa Sensat, 2005 (Emocions, 2002)
M'expliques un conte? (2010, Rosa Sensat)

 Translations into Catalan  
La no-violència en la pau i en la guerra de M. K. Gandhi (Ahimsa, 1983)
L'accident (Collision course) by Nigel Hinton (La Galera, 1987)
Mister Majeika de Humphrey Carpenter (Pirene, 1987)
Bhagavad Gita (Moll 1988)
Carles, Emma i Alberic de Margaret Greaves (La Galera, 1988)
Les fantàstiques proeses del doctor Boox (The fantastic feats of Doctor Boox) de Andrew Davies (La Galera, 1989)

References

External links
   http://www.escastellet.cat/2015/03/20/elisabet-abeya-acosta-joan-mascaro-al-cicle-el-darrer-divendres/
 https://www.youtube.com/watch?v=t4DbvSw8uRs

1951 births
Living people
Writers from Barcelona
Novelists from Catalonia
Women writers from Catalonia
20th-century Spanish novelists
20th-century Spanish women